Santa Isabel is a town in the province of La Pampa, Argentina. It lies on the west of the province, 240 km from the provincial capital Santa Rosa, by National Route 143, near the junction of the borders of the provinces of La Pampa, San Luis and Mendoza, in the area of the Atuel River marshlands.

Climate

References

 

Populated places in La Pampa Province
Populated places established in 1904
Cities in Argentina
La Pampa Province
Argentina